Machino is the name of several rural localities in Russia:
Machino, Krasnoyarsk Krai, a village in Berezovsky Selsoviet of Abansky District of Krasnoyarsk Krai
Machino (Klyapovskoye Rural Settlement), Beryozovsky District, Perm Krai, a village in Beryozovsky District of Perm Krai; municipally, a part of Klyapovskoye Rural Settlement of that district
Machino (Beryozovskoye Rural Settlement), Beryozovsky District, Perm Krai, a village in Beryozovsky District of Perm Krai; municipally, a part of Beryozovskoye Rural Settlement of that district